Peter J. Hammond (born c. 1930s; sometimes credited as P. J. Hammond) is a British television writer and novelist.

Career

Hammond's television career began in the 1960s, when he began by working on BBC police dramas such as Dixon of Dock Green and Z-Cars, on the latter of which he served as script editor for a year from 1969 to 1970. In 1970 he also wrote for the fantasy series Ace of Wands, and later in the decade contributed to the soap opera Emmerdale Farm. He also continued to write for crime and police dramas, penning episodes of The Sweeney. He also created the offbeat 1984 sitcom Lame Ducks.

In the 1980s and 1990s, Hammond wrote for popular ITV police/detective shows The Gentle Touch, The Bill and Wycliffe, as well as for Doctor Finlay, the new production of the 1960s BBC series Dr. Finlay's Casebook. He returned to the science fiction genre by writing an episode of the 1998 Sky One series Space Island One, although his episode was ultimately one of those that went untransmitted until 2002.

Work in the 2000s included many episodes of the popular murder mystery series Midsomer Murders.

Sapphire & Steel
P.J. Hammond is best known for the creation of the science-fiction fantasy series Sapphire & Steel, produced by ATV and screened on the ITV network in the UK from 1979 to 1982. Hammond, who had conceived the series after spending an evening in a supposedly haunted house, wrote five of the six serials that made up the programme, as well as a novelisation of the first serial.

Doctor Who and spin-offs
In 1986, Hammond was approached to write for Doctor Who, during the troubled production of Season 23's  The Trial of a Time Lord. His story, titled Paradise Five, was liked by then-script editor Eric Saward, but rejected by producer John Nathan-Turner while the script was still being worked on. The script was later revived in 2009–2010 by Big Finish Productions for a full cast audio drama, Paradise 5, with the final script written by both Hammond and new material by Andy Lane, starring the Sixth Doctor (Colin Baker) and his companion Peri Brown (Nicola Bryant). Paradise 5 was one of eight stories made as part of the first "Lost Stories" season featuring several commissioned, but never filmed, scripts.

In October 2005, it was announced by the BBC Press Office that Hammond would be one of the writers of the new science fiction crime series Torchwood, a spin-off from the popular BBC One show Doctor Who. His episode, "Small Worlds", was shown on 12 November 2006, directly opposite one of his Midsomer Murders scripts, "Dance with the Dead", on ITV1. He also wrote the episode "From Out of the Rain" for the second series of Torchwood, shown on BBC Three on 12 March 2008.

Novel
In 2018 Hammond released his first novel, Downtimers.

Writing credits

References

External links

Sapphire & Steel-based interview at Anorakzone.com fansite.
Torchwood press release at bbc.co.uk, with Hammond announced as a writer on the series.

20th-century British screenwriters
21st-century British screenwriters
21st-century British novelists
British soap opera writers
British television writers
British male novelists
British male screenwriters
British science fiction writers
Living people
1930s births